Pachakhali is a village in the Ghritagram-I No. Gram Panchayat Paschim Medinipur district of West Bengal, India. The population is more than 1000. A primary school is located in this village.

References

Villages in Paschim Medinipur district